Matthew Dobson (born 16 December 1986) is a South African rugby union footballer. His regular playing position is hooker.

He left  at the start of 2014 to continue his playing career in England.

References

External links
 
 

1986 births
Living people
Expatriate rugby union players in England
Griquas (rugby union) players
London Welsh RFC players
Rugby union hookers
Rugby union players from Pietermaritzburg
South African expatriate rugby union players
South African expatriate sportspeople in England
South African people of British descent
South African rugby union players
Stellenbosch University alumni